Calderhead is a Scottish surname. Notable people with the surname include:

David Calderhead (1864–1938), Scottish footballer and manager
David Calderhead Jr., Scottish footballer and manager, son of David
Iris Calderhead (1889–1966), American suffragist and organizer
William A. Calderhead (1844–1928), American politician

Scottish surnames
English-language surnames